Vicente Guirri (died 1640) was a religious Augustinian Spanish painter of the Baroque period.
He was born in Valencia, and became a friar in the Augustine convent of that city in 1608. He painted devotional themes.

References

1640 deaths
People from Valencia
Painters from the Valencian Community
Spanish Baroque painters
17th-century Spanish painters
Spanish male painters
Year of birth unknown